The Château de Doué-la-Fontaine, also known as Motte de la Chapelle, is a motte and bailey castle in Doué-la-Fontaine, France that was built upon the foundations of an older 9th century Carolingian aula, and the Château de Doué-la-Fontaine, having been built around the year 950, is widely believed to have been the oldest known castle built out of stone. Only the aula survives today, while the castle and most of the motte no longer survive.

History
On the site of the castle, an older Carolingian aula was built during the 9th century for the Count of Anjou and was owned at one point by King Robert I of France before his death in 923. Around 950, the stone castle was built by the Count of Blois (probably Robert, Count of Blois) and an annex cellar was also built using the remains of the older aula.

The keep was destroyed in 1026 by Fulk Nerra and the aula was made into a completely blind cellar along with the kitchen of the keep (which no longer survives today; only the Carolingian aula survives today, which was built below the Medieval castle, and the motte upon which the castle was built), and the kitchen being turned into a cellar during the 10th century is supported by the fact that graffiti was found dating to the 10th century written by an unknown man named Aimeri - all that is known about him is that he devoted this graffiti to King Louis the Pious. 

The site was refortified in both 1468 and 1472 (during the third quarter of the 15th century), but neither of these fortifications survive today either. The motte was then known as "Motte de la Chapelle" and in 1966, the motte was going to be levelled by Michel de Boüard, but when a mechanical device gutted the mound and uncovered traces of masonry, the site was stopped and the ruins were excavated and it was made a historical monument on December 19, 1973. Most of the motte was still eventually flattened to expose as much of the ruins of the aula as possible.

Gallery

References 

Castles in France
Motte-and-bailey castles
Ruined castles in France